Pieter Smit (11 October 1963 – 10 April 2018) was a Dutch police officer and politician, belonging to the Democrats 66 (D66) party.

Smit was born in Delfzijl. He held a commanding position in the former Haaglanden police force before entering full-time into politics. He was elected into the municipal council of Zoetermeer in 1994 and became an alderman in 2006.

From 1 September 2010 until his death in April 2018, he was mayor of Oldambt. He was the first non-acting mayor after the establishment of this new Groningen municipality on 1 January 2010.

He also performed several ancillary functions, like commissioner of Groningen Airport Eelde.

Pieter Smit died suddenly of a cardiac arrest in his hometown Scheemda, aged 54.

Naming 
The Pieter Smit Bridge (a series of bridges) in the province of Groningen are named after him.

References 
 In Memoriam: Pieter Smit (1963-2018), OldambtNu, 12 April 2018
 Burgemeester Pieter Smit (54) aan hartstilstand overleden, Dagblad van het Noorden, 10 April 2018
 Burgemeester Pieter Smit van Oldambt door hartstilstand overleden, NOS, 10 April 2018

1963 births
2018 deaths
20th-century Dutch civil servants
20th-century Dutch politicians
21st-century Dutch civil servants
21st-century Dutch politicians
Aldermen in South Holland
Democrats 66 politicians
Dutch police officers
Mayors in Groningen (province)
Municipal councillors in South Holland
People from Delfzijl
People from Oldambt (municipality)
People from Zoetermeer